Zac Cini (born 24 May 2000) is an Australian professional rugby league footballer who plays as a  or er for the Parramatta Eels in the NRL.

Background
Cini was born in Sydney and is of Maltese descent.

Cini played his junior rugby league for the Minchinbury Jets. He later said, "I grew up supporting the Tigers. I loved Benji in 2005 and I used to sit in the lounge room watching him on TV. When he played the grand final I was five and I used to go out into the yard and try to practise the Benji step."

Playing career

Early career
Cini came through the Penrith Panthers junior system playing in their SG Ball championship winning team of 2018, he was educated at St Dominic's College, Penrith where he made the Australian Schoolboys rugby league team in that same year.

2021
Cini was named to his debut in round 8 for the Tigers, starting on the wing against the St. George Illawarra Dragons away at WIN Stadium. At the time he was leading the lower NSW Cup competition in post-contact metres, tackle breaks, runs and run metres. He scored a try and had another disallowed as he "starred" in his first game. He said after the match, "I got about 20 tickets for family and my mates organised a bus. I think there was about 50 of them that jumped on the bus and sat in that corner. You could definitely hear them. It is a dream just to play footy but to score on debut with my mates in that corner, just the support they gave was awesome and made it 10 times better." The Sydney Morning Herald said, "The flying mullet man from Minchinbury, a mad Wests Tigers fan, became an instant cult hero."

Cini played a total of four matches for the Wests Tigers in the 2021 NRL season as the club finished 13th and missed the finals.
In December 2021, Cini was released by the Wests Tigers and he joined NSW Cup side Newtown.

2022
Before the start of the 2022 NSW Cup season, Cini departed Newtown and signed a contract to join Parramatta's NSW Cup team.

References

External links
Wests Tigers profile

2000 births
Living people
Australian rugby league players
Rugby league centres
Rugby league players from Sydney
Rugby league wingers
Western Suburbs Magpies NSW Cup players
Wests Tigers players